Foxhome can refer to a community in the United States:

 Foxhome, Minnesota, a small city
 Foxhome Township, Wilkin County, Minnesota